Lancaster High School may refer to:

Central Lancaster High School in Lancaster, Lancashire, England
Lancaster High School (California) in Lancaster, California
Lancaster High School (New York) in Lancaster, New York
Lancaster High School (Ohio) in Lancaster, Ohio
Lancaster High School (South Carolina), in Lancaster, South Carolina
Lancaster High School (Texas), in Lancaster, Texas
Lancaster High School (Virginia) in Lancaster, Virginia